Pottersville is a 2017 American Christmas comedy film directed by Seth Henrikson and written by Liam Stahl. The film stars Michael Shannon, Judy Greer, Thomas Lennon, Ron Perlman, Christina Hendricks, and Ian McShane. The film was released on November 10, 2017, by Echo Bridge.

Plot
It's Christmastime, Maynard Grieger is a general store owner in Pottersville, a small town, struggling since the local mill closed. Returning home early from work to surprise his wife, Connie, he finds that she is a furry, along with Jack, the sheriff. Connie states that she needs more excitement in her life, and would like some time apart.

After drunkenly returning to his store and telling his story to Parker, his clerk, Maynard dresses up in a gorilla costume and walks around town, startling many of the townspeople. The next morning, he awakes to find he was misidentified as Bigfoot. Intending to confess, Maynard realizes the potential economic benefits from tourism that Bigfoot sightings may bring, so continues to dress up.

As the hype continues to grow about Bigfoot, the town is visited by Brock Masterson, the host of a monster-hunting reality television show. Although he pretends to be finding evidence of Bigfoot for his show, he is privately skeptical of its existence. After encountering Maynard, in costume, Brock becomes scared to continue, and wishes to leave town.

Brock decides to continue his search for Bigfoot, with the help of Jack and Bart, a local hunter. Back in town, Parker discovers that Maynard has been dressing up as Bigfoot, and attempts to dissuade him from dressing up again, for fear that Bart will shoot him. Maynard decides to dress up again anyway, and is captured by Brock.

Brock brings "Bigfoot" back to town, where Parker reveals that it is Maynard in a gorilla suit. Brock announces his intention to sue the town, and the angry townspeople force him to close the store. Parker meets with the townspeople, and shows them that Maynard simply wishes to help the town; his ledger that he ostensibly used to keep an account of their purchases on credit, is left blank.

The townspeople forgive Maynard, and proceed to his store to apologize and pay their debts. Connie forgives him, asking him to take her back, but he refuses. Brock is discovered to be a fraud, and is fired from his television show. Realizing the global interest in Bigfoot, Maynard and Parker reopen the Pottersville Mill as a museum about Bigfoot. As Maynard and Parker kiss, they hear an ominous howl in the distance.

Cast
 Michael Shannon as Maynard Greiger
 Judy Greer as Parker
 Ron Perlman as Sheriff Jack
 Thomas Lennon as Brock Masterson
 Christina Hendricks as Connie Greiger
 Ian McShane as Bart 
 Michael Torpey as Norm
 Blake Perlman as Tammy Henderson
 Greta Lee as Ilene
 Elena Hurst as Stacy Gutierrez
 Timothy Davis-Reed as John Logan
 Mary Ashley as Sue
 Julian Lerner as Samuel

Production
Pottersville was filmed in Hamilton and Syracuse, New York. Six students from nearby Colgate University received internships for the production, and one faculty member served as an extra in the film.   Principal photography ended in May 2016.

Release
The film premiered at the Hamilton Movie Theater in Hamilton on November 10, 2017. Following a limited theater release, the film was released on DVD and streaming services by Echo Bridge.

Critical response 

Music
Pottersville features a mix of classic Christmas tunes. Pottersville (Original Motion Picture Soundtrack) was released December 15, 2017.

See also
 List of Christmas films

References

External links
 
 

2017 films
2010s English-language films
2010s Christmas comedy films
American Christmas comedy films
Bigfoot films
Furry fandom
2017 comedy films
2017 independent films
2010s American films